Id Crook Memorial Trophy is the sailing trophy awarded at the Masters Snipe World Championships. The Id Crook Memorial Trophy is awarded to the winning skipper and crew. It was donated to the Snipe Class International Racing Association (SCIRA) by Canada. It's named after Canadian Id Crook, SCIRA's commodore in 2000. 

The regatta venue must rotate among North America, Europe, South America and Japan. No races to be run in wind velocity exceeding 15 knots.
 
Skipper must be at least 45 years of age in the year of the regatta. Combined age of skipper and crew must be at least 80 years in the year of the regatta.

4 divisions of medals are presented for trophies for top 3 places in the following divisions:
Apprentice Master Division (45-54 years)
Master Division (55-64 years)
Grand Master Division (65-74 years)
Master Legends Division (75 years old and onwards)
Overall Master World Champion will be top placing team.

The Master Legends Division was created in 2015

Winners 

^The 2008 Snipe World Masters could not be completed due to wind conditions and the inability to achieve 3 races, which is the minimum for a Championship.

References

External links 
Results

Snipe World Championships
Senior sailing